Dyg may refer to:
 the abbreviation of Dayang, a Bruneian honorific
 Tegh, an Armenian village